Terry Hawthorne (born January 1, 1990) is a Cornerbacks coach for Southern Illinois University. He was drafted by the Pittsburgh Steelers with the 17th pick in the 5th round of the NFL's 2013 Draft. Hawthorne was released by the Pittsburgh Steelers on August 31, 2013. He previously attended the University of Illinois. Hawthorne was a 2008 USA Today High School All-American selection as a wide receiver.

Hawthorne attended East St. Louis High School, Class of 2009 where he played receiver, defensive back, punter and punt returner, and has been a starter since his sophomore year. On offense, he scored 28 touchdowns and recorded 1,009 receiving yards as a senior, while defensively, he recorded 118 tackles and eight interceptions, three returned for touchdowns. Regarded as four-star recruit by Rivals.com, Hawthorne was listed as the No. 6 wide receiver prospect of the class of 2009. Hawthorne is now the cornerbacks coach for Southern Illinois University.

References

External links
Southern Illinois Salukis bio

1990 births
Living people
American football cornerbacks
Illinois Fighting Illini football players
Under Armour All-American football players
Pittsburgh Steelers players
Players of American football from Illinois
Sportspeople from East St. Louis, Illinois